Womb of Dreams is the debut album by electro-disco band Fan Death. It was released on August 6, 2010.

Critical reception
Luke Winkie of musicOMH wrote that "The album becomes more traditionalist and (un-coincidentally) more fun-loving around its middle...When Fan Death are clicking, they're a force to be reckoned with, the band's chemistry practically oozing from the songs."

Garry Mulholland from the BBC wrote that Fan Death had "made a debut album that successfully adds up to more than the sum of its hip influences" and "will induce waves of pure pleasure in those of us who will never tire of a melancholy melody, a dodgy synthetic string motif and a disco beat."

Track listing
 "Constellations"
 "Veronica's Veil"
 "Choose Tonight"
 "Phantom Sensation"
 "The Best Night"
 "When The Money's Right"
 "Reunited"
 "The Son Will Rise"
 "Crowd Control"
 "Side By Side"
 "Almost There"

Personnel
Producer- Szam Findlay
Vocals- Dandilion Wind Opaine, Marta Jacuibek-McKeever
Music- Szam Findlay, Dandilion Wind Opaine,
Lyrics- Dandilion Wind Opaine

Additional musicians
Ariel Barnes- Cello
Max Murphy- Baritone saxophone
Dameian Walsh- Alto saxophone
Nimish Parekh- Trombone
Kent Wallace- Trumpet
Markus Takizawa- Viola
Mark Ferris- 1st Violin
Cameron Wilson- 2nd Violin
Parker Bossley- Bass

Production
Mike Marsh- Audio mastering
Austin Garrick and Mike Rocha- Mixing
Leo Chadburn- String & Horn Arrangement/Conductor
Matt Anderson- Additional Drum Programming (tracks 2–5)
Kevin James Maher- Vocal and Bass Engineer 
Scott Ternan- String & Horn Engineer

References

2010 debut albums
Fan Death albums
Last Gang Records albums